The first edition of the field hockey Men's Hockey Tournament at the Commonwealth Games took place during the 1998 Commonwealth Games at the Bukit Jalil Stadium in Kuala Lumpur, Malaysia. The event started on Wednesday 9 September and ended on Sunday 20 September 1998.

Participating nations

Round robin

Pool A

All times local (UTC +8)

Wednesday 9 September 1998

Thursday 10 September 1998

Saturday 12 September 1998

Monday 14 September 1998

Tuesday 15 September 1998

Wednesday 16 September 1998

Thursday 17 September 1998

Pool B

All times local (UTC +8)

Wednesday 9 September 1998

Thursday 10 September 1998

Saturday 12 September 1998

Sunday 13 September 1998

Tuesday 15 September 1998

Wednesday 16 September 1998

Thursday 17 September 1998

Play–offs

Semi-finals

Bronze-medal match

Gold-medal match

Final ranking

Awards

Medalists

References
Fieldhockey Canada
KL 98 Commonwealth Games Men Hockey Final - YouTube

Hockey at the 1998 Commonwealth Games